Wujiang or Wu Jiang may refer to:

Places
Wujiang District, Shaoguan, a district of Shaoguan, Guangdong
Wujiang District, Suzhou, a district in Suzhou, Jiangsu
Wujiang railway station (zh), a freight-only station on the Sichuan–Guizhou railway in Wujiang, Guizhou
Wujiang, Anhui (zh), a town in He County, Anhui
Wujiang, Gansu (zh), a town in and subdivision of Ganzhou District, Zunyi, Guizhou
Wujiang, Guangxi (zh), a town in Zhaoping County, Guangxi
Wujiang, Guizhou (zh), a town in and subdivision of Bozhou District, Zunyi, Guizhou
Wujiang, Nanjing (zh), a town in Pukou District, Nanjing, Jiangsu
Wujiang, Jiangxi (zh), a town in Jishui County, Jiangxi

Rivers
Wu River (disambiguation), Wu Jiang in Chinese

See also
Jiang Wu (born 1967), Chinese actor